K219, or similar, may refer to:

K-219 (Kansas highway), a former state highway in Kansas
Soviet submarine K-219, a former Soviet Union Navy ship
Violin Concerto No. 5 (Mozart) in A major, by Mozart